Marjorie Griffin is a former camogie player, captain of the All Ireland Camogie Championship winning team in 1946.

Career
Born in Clare she moved to live in Antrim. She was play-maker from defence on the Antrim 1946 team that defeated Down, Armagh, Cavan and Derry to win the Ulster championship. She won further All Ireland senior medals in 1945 and 1947.

References

External links
 Camogie.ie Official Camogie Association Website
 Wikipedia List of Camogie players

Living people
Antrim camogie players
Clare camogie players
Year of birth missing (living people)